The 2023 World Championship of Ski Mountaineering was held in Boí Taüll, Spain, from 28 February 28 to 5 March 2023. It was the twelfth edition of the event.

Medal summary

Medal table

Senior

Men

Women

Mixed

Under-23

Men

Women

Under-20

Men

Women

Under-18

Men

Women

Youth Mixed

References

External links 
 Statistics, ISMF

2023
World Championships of Ski Mountaineering
Skiing competitions in Spain
International sports competitions hosted by Spain
World Championships of Ski Mountaineering
World Championship of Ski Mountaineering
World Championship of Ski Mountaineering